In Greek mythology, the name Ornytus (Ancient Greek: Ὄρνυτόν) may refer to:

Ornytus or Ornytion, son of Sisyphus.
Ornytus or Ornytion, grandson of the above, father of Naubolus.
Ornytus, possible leader of the army that came from Teuthis to join in the campaign against Troy. Alternately, the leader was named Teuthis.
Ornytus, a Bebrycian briefly mentioned in the Argonautica: he helps Amycus to put his gauntlets on for the boxing match with Polydeuces.
Ornytus, a Dolonian killed by Idmon.
Ornytus, a soldier who fought under Aeneas and was killed by Camilla.
Ornytus, a soldier who fought with the Seven against Thebes, and survived the war.
Ornytus, the man believed to have led a colony in Caria together with Ioxus, son of Melanippus (the son of Theseus and Perigune).

Notes

References 

 Apollonius Rhodius, Argonautica translated by Robert Cooper Seaton (1853-1915), R. C. Loeb Classical Library Volume 001. London, William Heinemann Ltd, 1912. Online version at the Topos Text Project.
 Apollonius Rhodius, Argonautica. George W. Mooney. London. Longmans, Green. 1912. Greek text available at the Perseus Digital Library.
 Gaius Valerius Flaccus, Argonautica translated by Mozley, J H. Loeb Classical Library Volume 286. Cambridge, MA, Harvard University Press; London, William Heinemann Ltd. 1928. Online version at theio.com.
 Gaius Valerius Flaccus, Argonauticon. Otto Kramer. Leipzig. Teubner. 1913. Latin text available at the Perseus Digital Library.
 Lucius Mestrius Plutarchus, Lives with an English Translation by Bernadotte Perrin. Cambridge, MA. Harvard University Press. London. William Heinemann Ltd. 1914. 1. Online version at the Perseus Digital Library. Greek text available from the same website.
 Publius Papinius Statius, The Thebaid translated by John Henry Mozley. Loeb Classical Library Volumes. Cambridge, MA, Harvard University Press; London, William Heinemann Ltd. 1928. Online version at the Topos Text Project.
 Publius Papinius Statius, The Thebaid. Vol I-II. John Henry Mozley. London: William Heinemann; New York: G.P. Putnam's Sons. 1928. Latin text available at the Perseus Digital Library.
 Publius Vergilius Maro, Aeneid. Theodore C. Williams. trans. Boston. Houghton Mifflin Co. 1910. Online version at the Perseus Digital Library.
 Publius Vergilius Maro, Bucolics, Aeneid, and Georgics. J. B. Greenough. Boston. Ginn & Co. 1900. Latin text available at the Perseus Digital Library.

Characters in the Aeneid
Characters in Greek mythology